The Yangon River (also known as the Rangoon River or Hlaing River) is formed by the confluence of the Pegu and Myitmaka Rivers in Myanmar. It is a marine estuary that runs from Yangon (also known as Rangoon) to the Gulf of Martaban of the Andaman Sea. The channel is navigable by ocean-going vessels, thus plays a critical role in the economy of Myanmar.

The Twante Canal connects the Yangon River with the Irrawaddy Delta, once known as 'the rice bowl of Asia'.

References 

Rivers of Myanmar
Geography of Yangon